María Clara Berenbau Giuria (7 November 1980 – 24 April 2013), also known as Clarita Berenbau, was a Uruguayan presenter, announcer, columnist, actress, writer, and journalist.

Biography
Clara Berenbau was born in Montevideo on 7 November 1980. In 2005, she married Daniel "Cuqui" Yaquinta at the La Candelaria Church in Punta del Este. They became parents of two children on 24 April 2012, Salvador and Guadalupe.

Berenbau worked in television and hosted the program Vamos on Teledoce, as well as Cuatro Estaciones and Tiempo de Campo on Channel 5. She was a columnist for shows on the TV programs Hola Vecinos and Arriba Gente on Channel 10. On the radio she hosted Viva la Tarde. In theater she starred in the play Estoy sola porque quiero.

In 2007 she was diagnosed with breast cancer. Berenbau died in Montevideo on 24 April 2013, at age 32.

Awards

 2007 and 2010 – Iris Award for most elegant
 2012 – Iris Award for best radio host

Book
In 2011, Berenbau published the autobiography  (Palabra Santa) detailing her struggle with cancer. She was writing a second book at the time of her death.

References

External links
 

1980 births
2013 deaths
Actresses from Montevideo
Autobiographers
Deaths from breast cancer
Deaths from cancer in Uruguay
Uruguayan radio journalists
Uruguayan women radio journalists
Uruguayan radio presenters
Uruguayan women radio presenters
Uruguayan television presenters
Uruguayan columnists
Uruguayan women columnists
Women autobiographers
Writers from Montevideo
Uruguayan women television presenters